Sandra Paños García-Villamil (born 4 November 1992) is a Spanish professional footballer who plays as a goalkeeper for Barcelona and the Spain national team. Paños currently serves as Barcelona's third captain.

At Barcelona, Paños has won two league titles, three Copas de la Reina, and the UEFA Women's Champions League, the latter of which was won in 2020–21 season as a part of Barcelona's first continental treble. Internationally, she has represented Spain at three major tournaments- the 2015 FIFA Women's World Cup, the 2017 UEFA Women's Euro, and the 2019 FIFA Women's World Cup.

Individually, Paños has earned a record four Zamora Trophies, the award given to the goalkeeper who concedes the least amount of goals in a Primera Division season.

Early life 
Sandra Paños García-Villamil was born on 4 November 1992, to Luis Ernesto Paños and Gemma García-Villamil. Paños began playing as a goalkeeper when there was a vacant position in goal for her futsal team. She later played 7-a-side football before playing for her first club, Sporting Plaza de Argel (formerly known as Hércules), when she was 10 years old. Her father formerly played for Hércules in the 1980s.

Club career

Levante (2010–2015) 
In 2010, Paños made the jump to the Spanish first division when she signed for Levante. Despite offers from Atlético Madrid, she chose Levante because of the club's proximity to her hometown of Alicante. After a successful first season, she renewed her contract with the club in 2011 until 2012.

On 4 June 2015, Paños scored the first and only goal of her career with a free-kick from midfield against Espanyol.

Barcelona (2015–present) 
At 22 years old, Paños moved from Levante to Barcelona after the 2015 FIFA Women's World Cup, the summer that the Catalan club professionalised their women's side. In her first Champions League season, Panos was named to the UEFA Women's Champions League Squad of the season, the first ever Barcelona player to do so. She was also the recipient of her first Zamora Trophy.

In the 2017–18 season at Barcelona, she received her second Zamora Trophy for conceding just 12 goals in 26 league matches. Paños shared goalkeeping duties with Laura Ràfols until Ràfols' retirement in 2018. The season following Ràfols' departure, she picked up a captaincy role for the first time in blaugrana and was named the club's third captain. In 2019, Paños was given her third Zamora Trophy award, conceding a personal-best 11 goals in the 2018–19 league season. For the 2019–20 season, her role as captain was decreased to fourth captain as Alexia Putellas made the jump to second captain.

In 2020, following the premature end of the 2019–20 league season due to the COVID-19 pandemic, Paños was awarded her fourth Zamora Trophy, a record number. That season, she conceded a personal-best 0.26 goals per game.

In the quarterfinals of the UEFA Women's Champions League, Paños saved a penalty from Manchester City’s Chloe Kelly and recorded a clean sheet in a 3–0 win. In May 2021, Paños extended her Barcelona contract to June 2024. Days after announcing her contract extension, she started the second Champions League final of her career and recorded a clean sheet against Chelsea, as the team won the match 4–0. Paños was named to the 2020-21 UEFA Women's Champions League Squad of the Season, and later won the 2020-21 UEFA Women's Champions League Goalkeeper of the Season award. At the end of the 2020-21 league season, she had conceded a league-best 12 goals. Paños was ineligible to win the Zamora Trophy however, as she suffered a thigh injury in October 2020 that kept her out of play for three months, and did not complete in at least 28 matches.

Paños returned to her role as Barcelona's third captain ahead of the 2021–22 season, after regular captain Vicky Losada moved to Manchester City. In October 2021, she was named as a nominee to the 2021 Ballon d'or. On 31 October, Paños played in her 200th match for Barcelona in all competitions as her side won 8–1 against Real Sociedad.

International career
She was the first-choice goalkeeper at the 2009 U-17 Euro and the 2010 and 2011 U-19 Euros.

In September 2011, she was called to Spain's senior national team for the first time, replacing injured María José Pons. Five months later she made her debut in a friendly against Austria. She was a part of Spain's squad at the 2015 FIFA Women's World Cup, where she was Spain's third keeper.

Since Jorge Vilda's takeover of the national team in 2017, Paños has been a regular starter with Spain. She started each of Spain's four matches at the UEFA Women's Euro 2017, captaining the side in their final match of Group D against Scotland. Spain advanced to the quarterfinals but were eliminated in a penalty shoot-out by Austria, who scored all 5 of their penalties.

Despite having rotated with Lola Gallardo in goal during warm-up matches for the 2019 FIFA Women's World Cup, Paños started all four of Spain's matches of the final tournament. Spain advanced to the knockout round of a Women's World Cup for the first time in their history, facing the United States in the Round of 16. Paños faced two penalties, both of which were scored by Megan Rapinoe, and the United States won the match 2–1.

Personal life
Her brother, Javi, is also a footballer.

Career statistics

International

Honours
Barcelona
Primera División: 2019–20, 2020–21, 2021–22
UEFA Women's Champions League: 2020–21;
Copa de la Reina: 2017, 2018, 2019–20, 2020–21, 2021–22
Supercopa de España Femenina: 2019–20, 2021–22
Copa Catalunya: 2016, 2017, 2018, 2019

Spain U17
 UEFA Women's Under-17 Championship: 2010

Spain
 Algarve Cup: 2017
 Cyprus Cup: 2018

Individual
 Zamora Trophy: 2015–16, 2017–18, 2018–19, 2019–20
 UEFA Women's Champions League Squad of the Season: 2015–16, 2017–18, 2018–19, 2019–20, 2020–21
UEFA Women's Champions League Goalkeeper of the Season: 2020–21

References

External links
 
 
 Sandra Paños at FC Barcelona
 Sandra Paños at Levante UD 
 Sandra Paños at BDFutbol
 
 
 

Spanish women's footballers
Footballers from Alicante
1992 births
Living people
Spain women's international footballers
FC Barcelona Femení players
Primera División (women) players
2015 FIFA Women's World Cup players
Women's association football goalkeepers
Levante UD Femenino players
2019 FIFA Women's World Cup players
Sporting Plaza de Argel players
UEFA Women's Euro 2022 players
UEFA Women's Euro 2017 players